Throwing Myself is  the only studio album by Luti-Kriss. It was released in 2001 on Solid State Records. After the release of this album, the band changed their name to Norma Jean.

Track listing

Personnel
Luti-Kriss
 Josh Scogin – vocals
 Scottie Henry – lead guitar
 Chris Day – rhythm guitar
 Josh Doolittle – bass
 Mick Bailey – turntables, sampling (left during production)
 Daniel Davison – drums

Additional personnel
 Sammy Frenette – piano (track 2)
 Kris McCaddon - Art Work
 Alex "Condor" Aligizakis – engineer
 Bernie Grundman – mastering
 David Johnson – photography
 Dean Maher – engineer
 Chris Potter – technical support
 Jesse Smith – composer, pre-production, producer 
 Andre Wahl – mixing, producer

References

Luti-Kriss albums
2001 debut albums
Solid State Records albums